Estersnow  is a civil parish in  the ancient barony of Boyle in County Roscommon, Ireland.
It is 1295 hectares in area and contains the old churchyard. The area is mostly farmland but also contains the cavetown Loughs.

Notes

Civil parishes of County Roscommon